Legislative elections were held in Macau on 12 September 2021. This legislative election will return 33 members of the Legislative Assembly of Macau, with 14 directly elected by all electorates, 12 indirectly elected by special interest groups and 7 appointed by the Chief Executive 15 days after the announcement of the election results.

The voter turnout rate for the 2021 Legislative Assembly direct election stood at 42 per cent after polls closed, the lowest rate reported since the establishment of the Macau Special Administrative Region in 1999.

Mass disqualification 
The Electoral Affairs Commission for this legislative election unprecedentedly disqualified some 21 candidates who intended to contest in the direct elections. As a result of those 21 hopefuls having been barred from running, five candidate lists consequently became unqualified due to the electoral requirement of a minimum of 4 contenders in each list.

All pro-democracy candidates, except José Pereira Coutinho's candidate list, were barred from running in the election. The mass disqualification created shock as Macau has been seen as "obedient" to the Beijing Government, while disqualifying election candidates, which had happened in Hong Kong before, was believed to be unlikely in Macau.

Results 
The turnout of the election was only 42.38%, marking the lowest since the 1988 election. The mass disqualification was said to be the reason of residents not voting, but officials claimed the weather and pandemic as main factors instead. The number of invalid and blank ballots broke record, with some writing "trashed election", "democracy", name of disqualified candidate Antonio Ng, or foul languages.

Pro-democracy camp won 2 seats only out of 33, whilst the remaining were under the control of pro-government and pro-Beijing parties and politicians as expected.

References

Macau
Legislative
Elections in Macau
Macau